Dorney Park & Wildwater Kingdom is an American amusement and water park located between Allentown and Emmaus, Pennsylvania in the Lehigh Valley region of eastern Pennsylvania. The park features 64 rides, including six roller coasters, other adult and children's rides, and a waterpark, Wildwater Kingdom, with 19 water rides.

It features some of the world's most prominent roller coasters, including Steel Force, the eighth longest steel roller coaster in the world and the second longest on the U.S. East Coast.

The park is owned and operated by Cedar Fair.

History

Ownership
Dorney Park traces its history to 1860, when Solomon Dorney built a trout hatchery and summer resort on his estate outside of Allentown. In 1870, Dorney decided to convert the estate into a public attraction. Initially, the facility featured games, playground-style rides, refreshment stands, picnic groves, a hotel, and a restaurant. By the 1880s, Dorney had added a small zoo, and gardens.

When the Allentown-Kutztown Traction Company completed its trolley line from Allentown to Kutztown in 1899, the company added a stop at Dorney's park. Two years later, the traction company purchased the park, operating it until 1923. That year, the park was sold to Robert Plarr and two other partners. Plarr soon bought out his partners and ran Dorney Park until his death in 1966. Plarr built a house for his estranged wife Wiltracy Plarr in the 1930s under the first hill of Thunder Hawk in hopes of driving her to divorce. She lived there until the late 1980s, never granting him the divorce. Ownership then passed to Plarr's son, Stephen, who died within a year. Robert Ott, Plarr's son-in-law, took over as owner in 1967. In 1985, Ott sold Dorney Park to Harris Weinstein. Weinstein owned it until 1992, when he sold the park to Cedar Fair and is one of only fourteen trolley parks still operating in the United States.

Early years
Rides have come and gone at Dorney Park, such as the Philadelphia Toboggan Coasters's Grande Carousel which debuted at Dorney in 1932, but was destroyed in a September 1983 fire. The Bucket O' Blood (once known as Pirates Cove) dark ride burned in the same fire. Luckily, the incident occurred after the park was closed for the season. Another early ride was the Whip, in which riders spun on a small track in a pavilion. The Whip is still in operation today and is the park's oldest ride.

Dorney Park also had a swimming pool from the early 1900s until 1963. Plarr was pressured by local business owners to shut down the swimming pool because of "mixed" swimming. Local business owners threatened to boycott the park and stop having their company picnics at the park if he did not shut it down. One side of the former pool had live seals and fish, while the other side was used for the Whale Boats, motorised boats seating two people each. Near the lower entrance to the park was the dark ride called Tunnel Of Love which later was rethemed as The Journey to the Center of the Earth. The ride was a Bill Tracy mill chute. It was a boat ride through a dark tunnel with scary scenes behind glass, and a lift and drop at the end. It was razed following the 1992 season, after Cedar Fair, LP acquired the park. Journey To The Center Of The Earth was located near the park's first roller coaster, which opened in 1923. It was simply known as the Coaster or "the yellow rollercoaster" until 1989 when it was renamed Thunderhawk.  It still operates today.

Also near the pool was the Mill Chute, built in 1927 but closed in 1960 to become Journey to the Center of the Earth as described previously. Philadelphia Toboggan built a Cuddle-Up ride at the park in the mid-1940s; this would be enclosed and heavily air-conditioned in the late 1970s as The Iceberg, which featured strobe lights and loud music. It was painted black and retitled Meteorite at the end of the 1980s and removed after the 1993 season. The Gold Mine was a scary walk-through under the Solomon Dorney Mansion in the middle of the park near the Iceberg and PTC Carousel. The Gold Mine closed in the mid-1980s. The Flying Dutchman was a Pinfari compact steel coaster located where the Ferris Wheel is currently located. It was the largest of its kind. It was removed following the 1988 season due to mechanical problems.

For many years, a clown figure called "Alfundo" (the name was derived from a combination of the words Allentown, FUN and Dorney Park) reigned supreme as the park's trademark, and was used as the decoration of the main entrance to the park.

1980s

In 1980, Dorney Park Road, a former two-lane state highway which cut through the park, was closed to traffic and converted to a midway.  The state highway (LR 157, which became PA Route 222) had been rerouted more than 60 years earlier south of the park as Hamilton Boulevard. Dorney Park Road became a local street and the access road to the park. Prior to the road's closing, Dorney Park's narrow-gauge railroad crossed the road, which led to traffic stoppages every time the train was to cross Dorney Park Road. This railroad crossing also helped park patrons cross the road.

The road closing led to the enclosure of the park by fence and the introduction of a single-price admission fee, which eliminated individual ride tickets. The park previously maintained groves for family picnics. While the groves remained outside the park a while longer, patrons were no longer allowed to bring food inside.

In 1982, the park opened its log flume ride, Thunder Creek Mountain, which still owns the record for longest drop on a log flume ride. In the fall of 1983, a major fire destroyed a large section of the park, including the Carousel, Bucket O' Blood, Flying Bobs, Skeeball and several food stands. The park replaced the rides in 1984, its 100th anniversary, with the addition of Enterprise, Musik Express, Ranger, and Apollo 2000. New skeeball alleys, gift shops, and food stands were added as well.

With the addition of rides as well as improvements to the park, the park became a more attractive asset. It was sold mid-season to Harris Weinstein in 1985. He also bought a neighboring automobile racetrack which had once been used annually for NASCAR racing. The racetrack was razed and replaced by a waterpark named Wildwater Kingdom in 1985. Its admission was separate from the amusement park and attractions included a wave pool, a family water raft ride, body slides, tube slides, and a children's water play area. Season passes were also introduced the same year.

A looping roller coaster designed by Anton Schwarzkopf called Laser was added to the park's lineup in 1986, which featured two loops. It was originally designed as a portable ride for funfairs, but Dorney Park kept it permanently assembled. The coaster was named after a local Hot AC radio station known as Laser 104.1 at the time, later rebranded as WAEB-FM. In 1988, a kiddie coaster was added across from Laser and named Little Laser. The coaster was a former junior coaster placed in storage in 1982. Following Laser's removal in 2008, Little Laser was renamed Steel First.

The park further grew with debut of Hercules, a wooden terrain coaster in 1989. It was built on the top of the hill lining what was then the back of the park, near what was Wildwater Kingdom's parking lot. This coaster was the tallest wooden roller coaster in the world until Cedar Point's Mean Streak debuted in 1991, which boasted a first drop only  taller than Hercules. Hercules proved a big hit for Dorney in the coaster's first four seasons, but was soon known for its rough, often jarringly shaky ride, due in large part to significant modifications made to Hercules after the park was purchased by Cedar Fair in 1992. Hercules was removed in 2003 due to high maintenance costs and low ridership. Hydra the Revenge is now where Hercules once stood, which is why its slogan is "It's the Ride That Brought Down Hercules".

1990s

In 1991, Dorney Park added a few more flat rides and improved landscaping, preparing to once again sell it. Cedar Fair purchased the park in 1992 for $48M. In 1993, a new midway was being constructed to connect Wildwater Kingdom directly to Dorney Park. Also, the park built a flume ride that plunges riders in 20-passenger boats down an  drop, creating a giant wave that not only soaks riders, but onlookers as well. It was known as the Pepsi Chute and today as White Water Landing. It opened mid season in 1993 while the Midway was still under construction. It was built on the future midway next to Hercules and the Wildwater Kingdom parking lot.

In 1994, a new midway was completed on the top of the hill near Hercules and White Water Landing. This overhauled the look and feel of the park. The parking lot for Wildwater Kingdom was doubled in size and converted to serve both Dorney Park and Wildwater Kingdom. A new entrance was also built to Dorney Park. Some concession stands and a carousel was also added at this new midway. The new midway, though was pretty empty initially and more rides were planned for it for the future. The old lot and entrance also continued to be used. Dorney Park and Wildwater Kingdom, though were still separately gated until the end of that season. The park now charged guests a then-small charge for parking.

In 1995, admission to both Dorney Park and Wildwater Kingdom was offered at a single price for the first time. The change was promoted under the slogan "Two Parks for The Price Of One." Both the old and new entrances continued to be used. Over the next few years more rides and concessions were added to the new midway area of the park. 

In 1996, Dorney went "green" and transplanted 120 30-year-old trees in the new midway to make shade. It also made the park look nicer. It was designed by D.H. Morgan, a former employee of Arrow. Morgan helped design Magnum XL-200 at Cedar Point in 1988. This coaster would have a similar out and back layout but would have a smoother braking system and be a more pleasant ride than Magnum. It opened in an area that was previously considered the front of the park taking up that entire stretch of land. This coaster is known as Steel Force and opened in the spring of 1997. This brought the park up to four adult coasters and a kiddie coaster. At that point, the former front entrance was restricted to employees and was now considered the back entrance. Over the years, the waterpark added some newer water slides as well as a second lazy river.

In 1998, Dorney Park added a top spin ride called "Hang Time". At the end of this year, the "Monster" was temporarily removed and eventually relocated within the park. This was also the last year for the "Sky Ride", it was removed at the end of the season. During the offseason, the Laser was repainted in a neon green and purple style, replacing the red and white theme it had since its introduction to the park.

In 1999, a  tower called Dominator, featuring two gravity-defying rides, was added. One tower blasts riders straight up 15 stories before dropping them back to earth, while another tower slowly lifts riders to a staggering , then thrusts them downward at faster-than-free-fall speeds.

2000s 

2000 saw the debut of Camp Snoopy, a themed children's play area. A junior coaster (managed like a kiddie coaster in that adults without children cannot ride) called Woodstock Express was added that year, bringing the coaster count to eight, including four adult coasters, a junior coaster, and three kiddie coasters. The Wild Mouse was also added this year. Also, a new separate-charge admission thrill ride, Skyscraper, a Booster-type thrill ride by Gravity Works, Inc., was added.

In 2001, a Bolliger & Mabillard designed roller coaster called Talon was added near the now-front entrance of park. The ride was a steel inverted looping coaster with ski lift type seats, and approximately the size of the Raptor coaster at Cedar Point. The addition of the new adult coaster brought the park's roller coaster count to nine.

In 2002, the park added Meteor. Meteor is a flatride that was built by Zamperla in Italy. Meteor takes up to 24 riders each ride on 2 swing arms. The waterpark was also modified with a few waterslides.

In 2003, Wildwater Kingdom was overhauled. Several older body slides were removed and replaced with four modern colored body slides, two of which were open and two of which were enclosed tube slides. Three inflated tube slides were also added. One of the slides is mostly open and straight down, another is winding and completely enclosed, and the third slide also winds but is partially open. A new children's water play area was also added. In July, the park announced that Hercules would close Labor Day and in 2005 be replaced by Hydra the Revenge, a $13 million, steel floorless Bolliger & Mabillard coaster. Hercules closed and would be replaced as a result of high maintenance costs, a rough ride, and low ridership. Soon after, it was demolished, reducing the coaster count to eight.

In 2004, construction on Hydra began soon after razing Hercules and continued throughout the season. Around the same time, Skyscraper was relocated to Valleyfair, which ran from 2005 until 2007 before relocating to Cedar Point.

Hydra the Revenge opened on opening day for the 2005 season on  May 7, 2005. The coaster is a half-mile in length and features a drop. It is the first and only floorless roller coaster in Pennsylvania. The addition made the park home once again to nine adult and children's coasters.

On September 22, 2007, Dorney Park announced it would be opening its sixth adult roller coaster, a shuttle twisted impulse U-shaped coaster built by Intamin. The coaster, located at Geauga Lake in Aurora, Ohio, from 2000 to 2006, was originally known as Superman: Ultimate Escape, but was renamed Steel Venom when the park was bought by Cedar Fair from Six Flags in 2004. Steel Venom was removed from Geauga Lake in 2006 and unofficially opened as Voodoo at Dorney Park on 17 May 2008.  Its grand opening was held six days later.  The ride was renamed Possessed after the 2008 season to resolve a conflict with Six Flags, which held the rights to the name Voodoo.

In summer 2008, Dorney Park announced that Laser would be removed after the season ended to expand the park's opportunities, since it has been at Dorney Park since 1986. Laser took its final ride at Dorney Park on 1 November 2008. It now runs in Germany as Teststrecke and travels to different German Fairs.

In 2009, Dorney Park added "The Good Time Theatre." This theatre was announced in February 2009 and broke ground in April 2009. The theatre was finished in spring of 2009.

2010s 

In 2010, the park removed its bumper car ride called "Krazy Kars" to add the Demon Drop from Cedar Point. Rita's Italian Ice was also introduced as a new concession.  Meanwhile, the park announced that Planet Snoopy would open for the 2011 season.

In 2011, Dorney Park introduced an 8 million dollar extensive overhaul to the former Camp Snoopy kid's park area. The new area is named Planet Snoopy with additions such as seven new rides, a new family care centre offering services and amenities for parents and their young children, a new and larger outdoor amphitheatre, and extensive new PEANUTS theme attributes being applied to differentiate the now  kid's park from the rest of Dorney Park. Theme attributes include a new bright colour palette, large billboard like Planet Snoopy signage, arch entry ways, paver blocks on the midways instead of concrete, and a Snoopy sculpture as a centrepiece and kids photo op.

In 2012, Dorney Park added Stinger, formerly Invertigo from California's Great America, to its roller coaster collection. The park also added the new Fast Lane virtual queue system, already present at the other Cedar Fair parks, and "Dinosaurs Alive!" near the Steel Force entrance. "Dinosaurs Alive!" was a walkthrough attraction that guests paid an additional fee to access. It featured life-size, animatronic dinosaurs that move and produce sound effects. Children also had access to a faux dig site for unearthing fossils, bones, and other dinosaur-themed objects.

In 2013, Dorney Park featured no major new attractions, but rather small changes to the park, such as a new Fast Pay wristband, allowing guests to add money to an RFID prepaid wristband, allowing them to pay for food and merchandise without carrying cash. Snake Pit features six water slides, Python Plummet, which is three free-fall body slides, Constrictor, which is an enclosed tube slide, and Boa Blaster, which is a twin tube slide featuring high speed drops. Snake Pit replaced Riptide Run and The Lily Pads. The first slide pieces of Snake Pit began to arrive at Dorney Park on Wednesday, 22 January 2014. Snake Pit opened on 30 May. Also new for 2014 is an in park television channel called FUNtv. FUNtv is shown on television screens in the queue lines of many of the park's major attractions. Content shown includes weather, music videos, and trivia. The content for FUNtv is controlled out of sister park Kings Island in Mason OH.

On 17 November 2014, Dorney Park announced a new attraction for 2015, the Cedar Creek Flyers, to be located in the lower section of the park next to Stinger. The ride features eight eagle themed gondolas suspended twenty eight feet in the air. Riders spin around in a circle and are able to control their ride experience. This gives riders a unique opportunity to determine whether they want a mild ride or a more aggressive one. The ride is manufactured by Larson International, Inc.

Prior to the 2015 and 2016 seasons, Dorney Park removed their Top Spin ride, Hang Time and their S&S pendulum ride, Screamin' Swing.

On 18 August 2016, Dorney Park announced the return of their bumper car attractions, which will be named Dodgem, located in the location formerly occupied by Hang Time; and the addition of Kaleidoscope, a HUSS Troika, which will be located on the Main Midway, next to the Coasters Diner. Also, the addition of Parkside Pavilion, Cirque Imagine, as well as more cabanas and new food offerings including Auntie Anne's (replacing Philly Pretzel Factory), Papa Luigi's (which will be in the water park replacing Typhoon Treats), and a new drink refill station.

2020s 
On March 11, 2020, the park announced that it would be open as usual and that the COVID-19 pandemic should be resolved by that time. The park later announced, on March 20, 2020, that it would not open as scheduled for the 2020 season but would hopefully open later in the season, like other Cedar Fair parks.

On June 26, 2020, the park announced that it would be reopening with new safety protocols due to the COVID-19 pandemic. Dorney Park reopened to season pass holders on July 8, 2020, and then to all guests on July 11, 2020. It was also announced that Wildwater Kingdom would not open with the park. New safety procedures included pre-arrival health screenings, temperature checks, social distancing, limited ride capacity, and mandatory masks.

On August 4, 2020, the park announced that its water park, Wildwater Kingdom, would remain closed through 2020. The opening of Seaside Splashworks was pushed back until the 2021 season. Additionally, it was announced that Halloween Haunt, the park's premier Halloween event, would not occur in 2020. The park's final operating day for the 2020 season occurred on Labor Day, September 7, 2020. 

On March 12, 2021, the park announced that they would have a delayed opening for the 2021 season. Dorney Park opened on Saturday May 22, and Wildwater Kingdom opened on Saturday, May 29. Seaside Splashworks officially opened Memorial Day weekend. It was also announced that daily operations would begin on June 16. Then on June 17, due to staffing concerns, the park announced they would be closed on Mondays and Tuesdays throughout the duration of the summer. Grand Carnivale, the park's popular large international and cultural celebration, returned on operating dates between July 24 and August 8. 

In July 2021, the park announced that Halloween Haunt and the Great Pumpkin' Fest would return in 2021, operating select days from September 18 through October 31.

In 2022, The Whip underwent renovation that includes updating its bulbs and installing a flatter roof. Daily operation returned for the first time since the 2019 season. Grand Carnivale returned for its third season from July 23 through August 7. Halloween Haunt ran select nights from September 16 through October 29 and featured one new haunted maze and one new scare zone.

Attractions

Dorney Park first added a Dentzel Carousel in 1901, and has since grown to include 44 rides as of the 2022 season. See the complete list of rides at Dorney Park below for more information on each.

Roller coasters

Thrill rides

Family rides

Water rides

Kids Rides

Defunct roller coasters

Other past attractions

Wildwater Kingdom 

Wildwater Kingdom, located on the park grounds, is one of the largest water parks located within an amusement park in the United States with over a dozen water rides and pools. It opened in 1985 and has become a major summer attraction,  especially popular with residents from the surrounding Lehigh Valley and its two closest major cities, New York City and Philadelphia. Admission to Wildwater Kingdom is included with admission to Dorney Park.

Wildwater Kingdom has 22 water slides, three aquatic playlands for children, a water funhouse, two tubing rivers, two wave pools and other water rides. In the 2006 season, Wildwater Kingdom introduced an additional wave pool (called Wildwater Cove) to accommodate the immense popularity of the park's existing wave pool. The season pass lot was eliminated and now season pass holders must park in the regular lot at no additional cost. In 2007, a six-lane mat racing water slide called the Aqua Racer was added, sponsored by Capital BlueCross. Two enclosed tube slides, called Torpedo Tubes, were dismantled at the end of 2006. In 2014, Wildwater Kingdom opened a new slide complex called Snake Pit. Snake Pit features six slides total and includes Python Plummet, Boa Blasters, and Constrictor. Riptide Run and The Lily Pads were removed to make way for Snake Pit. Following the 2019 season, Island Water Works and the adjacent splash pad were removed to make room for Seaside Splashworks, which was set to open in summer 2020 but was pushed back a year.

Attractions

Fast Lane 

Fast Lane is a secondary queue system available at Cedar Fair amusement parks. For an additional cost separate from park admission, visitors can purchase Fast Lane passes in the form of a wrist band, which grants them access to the shorter queue available on many popular attractions.

Halloween Haunt 

Dorney Park's Halloween Haunt was originally introduced in 1998 as HalloWeekends, but was rebranded Halloween Haunt in 2008. 

Dorney Park's nighttime Halloween Haunt is intended for children 13 years of age and older, while the daytime Halloween event called The Great Pumpkin' Fest (formerly Boo!Blast) is intended for children and babies.

In 2015, Dorney Park's Boo Blast was renamed Snoopy's Halloween Party in order to end any confusion that it was scare-free and very family friendly. The scare-free event was rebranded again in 2016, when Snoopy's Halloween Party became The Great Pumpkin' Fest.

In 2022, Dorney Park's Halloween Haunt ran at night on Fridays and Saturdays from September 16 through October 29 plus a bonus Sunday on October 9. Boo Blast occurred during the day on Saturdays and Sundays from September 17 through October 30.

Current attractions 
Halloween Haunt currently features 12 attractions including seven mazes and five scare zones, as well as roaming Street Talent sliders and actors, and four live mainstage shows (Ghouling Organs, IllumiNightmares, Opening Scaremony, and Skeleton Crew).

Halloween Haunt Attraction history

Bus access 
LANta bus route 322 serves the park vicinity with the closest stop being on Route 222 at Lincoln Avenue. Private bus lines serve nearby Wescosville at the Park & Ride, which is also served by bus route 322.

In popular culture
In 2009, Dorney Park was featured in the TruTV show All Worked Up.

Portions of the 2005 music video for "Dirty Little Secret" by The All-American Rejects were filmed at Dorney Park.

In the 1988 movie Hairspray, Dorney Park is featured as the backdrop for the fictitious "Tilted Acres" amusement park, owned by the film's character Franklin Von Tussle, who is played by Sonny Bono.

Portions of the 1968 film Where Angels Go, Trouble Follows were filmed at Dorney Park.

In the 2022 Halloween episode of the ABC comedy Abbott Elementary, the janitor Mr. Johnson references a photograph made at Dorney Park.

See also 
 List of historic places in Allentown, Pennsylvania
 List of water parks
 Trolley park
 Incidents at Dorney Park & Wildwater Kingdom

References

Further reading 
 Futrell, Jim. Amusement Parks of Pennsylvania. Mechanicsburg, PA: Stackpole Books, 2002.

External links 

1884 establishments in Pennsylvania
Amusement parks in Pennsylvania
Buildings and structures in Allentown, Pennsylvania
Cedar Fair amusement parks
Cedar Fair water parks
 
Tourist attractions in Allentown, Pennsylvania
Water parks in Pennsylvania